Leisi Parish was a municipality in Saare County, Estonia.

The parish did consist of one small borough Leisi and 53 villages. The municipality had a population of 2,137 (as of 1 January 2010) and covered an area of 347.91 km².

During the administrative-territorial reform in 2017, all 12 municipalities on the island Saaremaa were merged into a single municipality – Saaremaa Parish.

Settlements
Small borough
Leisi
Villages
Angla - Aru - Aruste - Asuka - Hiievälja - Jõiste - Kaisa - Karja - Koiduvälja - Koikla - Kopli - Külma - Laugu - Liiva - Linnaka - Linnuse - Lõpi - Luulupe - Mätja - Meiuste - Metsaääre - Metsküla - Moosi - Mujaste - Murika - Nava - Nihatu - Nõmme - Nurme - Õeste - Oitme - Paaste - Pamma - Pammana - Parasmetsa - Pärsama - Peederga - Pöitse - Poka - Purtsa - Räägi - Ratla - Roobaka - Selja - Soela - Täätsi - Tareste - Tiitsuotsa - Tõre - Triigi - Tutku - Veske - Viira

Images

See also
 Municipalities of Estonia

References